The Talmud Unmasked (Latin: Christianus in Talmud Iudaeorum: sive, Rabbinicae doctrinae Christiani secreta. English: The secret rabbinical teachings concerning Christians) is a book published in 1892 by Justinas Bonaventure Pranaitis (1861–1917). The book, generally regarded as antisemitic, is a collection of purported quotations from the Talmud and Zohar that purports to demonstrate that Judaism despises non-Jews and promotes the murder of non-Jews in some instances. Pranaitis drew on the earlier works of Jakob Ecker and August Rohling.

Presentation of the book

The Talmud Unmasked is a collection of alleged quotes from the Talmud, the Zohar and other Talmudic works demonstrating that:
Jews do not regard non-Jews as human beings 
the Talmud contains blasphemies against Jesus and offensive passages about Christians
Judaism despises non-Jews 
the Talmud urges Jews to do a variety of harms to Christians, such as murder and theft, and teaches that each death of a Christian serves as a substitute for the Temple sacrifices, which would then hasten the arrival of the Jewish messiah.
"By means of numerous citations in Hebrew and Latin translations, he sought to demonstrate that the Talmud obliged Jews to injure Christians in multifarious ways, and to work for their elimination. Pranaitis drew on the works of the German anti-Talmudists Jakob Ecker and August Rohling. The book received the imprimatur of the church and was published by the press of the Academy of Sciences."
Michael, Robert, Dictionary of antisemitism from the earliest times to the present, Scarecrow Press, 2007, p 369:
"According to Pranaitis, the Talmud urged Jews to murder Christians, as each death of a Christian serving as a substitute for the Temple sacrifices, would hasten the arrival of the Jewish messiah. The Talmudic and Torah prohibitions about consuming blood were circumvented, according to Pranaitis, by boiling the blood."

Structure and themes
A portion of the book's outline is as follows:
Chapter I. Christians are to be Avoided
Art. 1. Christians Unworthy to Associate with Jews
Art. 2. Christians are Unclean
Art. 3. Christians are Idolaters
Art. 4. Christians are Evil
Chapter II. Christians are to be Exterminated 
Art. 1. Christians to be Harmed Indirectly
1. By not helping them
2. By interfering in their work
3. By deceit in legal matters
4. By harming them in things necessary for life
Art. 2. Christians to be Harmed Directly
1. Renegades to be killed
2. Apostates
3. Princes especially the Prince of Rome (the Pope) to be exterminated
4. All Christians to be killed
5. Killing a Christian is an acceptable sacrifice to God
6. Heaven promised to those who kill Christians
7. A Christian may be beheaded on the most solemn festivals
8. The Messiah expected will be revengeful
9. Jewish prayers against Christians
10. Christian prayers for the Jews

Accuracy and fabrication
Pranaitis could not read Aramaic (the primary language of the Talmud), and probably used works by August Rohling and others as his sources.

The book includes numerous quotations from the Talmud and the Zohar. His ignorance of some simple Talmudic Aramaic concepts and definitions, such as "hullin", was demonstrated during the Menahem Mendel Beilis blood libel case in which he testified as a "Talmud expert".

Antisemitism
Scholars classify The Talmud Unmasked as an anti-semitic and anti-Talmudic work, comparable to Der Talmud Jude by August Rohling (1871) and The Traditions of the Jews by Johann Eisenmenger (1700).

Use by apocalyptic cults
Jeffrey Kaplan describes how the book was used by cults to support apocalyptic theories, particular relating to the end-of-times.

See also
 Antisemitism
 Criticism of the Talmud
 Criticism of Judaism
 Johann Eisenmenger
 Protocols of the Elders of Zion

Notes

1892 non-fiction books
Antisemitic canards
Antisemitic forgeries
Antisemitism in Lithuania
Books critical of religion
Criticism of Judaism
Talmud